The Rural Municipality of Grey is a rural municipality in the Canadian province of Manitoba.  It named after Albert Grey, 4th Earl Grey, the former Governor General of Canada.

History
The RM was incorporated on February 9, 1906. It amalgamated with the Village of St. Claude on January 1, 2015 as a requirement of The Municipal Amalgamations Act for municipalities with a population less than 1,000 residents. The Government of Manitoba initiated these amalgamations in order for municipalities to meet the 1997 minimum population requirement of 1,000 to incorporate a municipality.

Communities 
 Culross
 Elm Creek
 Fannystelle
 Haywood
 St. Claude

Demographics 

References

External links 

2015 establishments in Manitoba
Manitoba municipal amalgamations, 2015
Grey